Peter Wenger (10 April 1944 – 23 July 2016) was a Swiss international footballer.

Club career
Wenger started his youth football with his local team in Küssnacht. He played as an outside left for Luzern between 1965 and 1966. Between 1966 and 1974 he played for FC Basel in the Nationalliga A and won five league titles, the Swiss Cup once and the first edition of the Swiss League Cup in 1972. During his time with Basel he played a total of 221 competitive games and scored 63 goals. In the summer of 1974 he transferred to Nordstern where he played for six seasons.

International career
Wenger played seven games for the Swiss national team in the years 1969 and 1970. He made his international debut on 24 September 1969 in an international friendly at the Mithatpaşa Stadium as he was substituted in at half time. Switzerland lost 0−3 against Turkey. He played his last international game on 20 December 1970. Switzerland won 2−1 against Malta in the Empire Stadium in Gżira during the UEFA Euro 1972 qualifying stage.

Honours
Basel
 Swiss League champion: 1966-67, 1968-69, 1969-70, 1971-72 1972-73
 Swiss Cup winner: 1966-67
 Swiss League Cup winner: 1972
 Coppa delle Alpi winner: 1969, 1970
 Uhrencup winner: 1969, 1970

References

External links
 Profile on footballdatabase.eu

1944 births
2016 deaths
FC Luzern players
FC Basel players
FC Nordstern Basel players
Swiss men's footballers
Switzerland international footballers
Association football outside forwards
Sportspeople from the canton of Schwyz